Manfredi Beninati is an Italian artist born in Palermo (Sicily) in 1970. A contemporary figurative painter, his oeuvre also covers installations, drawings, sculpture, collage and film.

Biography
After dropping out of both law and film school and collaborating with well-known Italian directors, Manfredi Beninati began working as an artist. He spent some time in Spain and England and, in 2002, when he came back to Italy, he began to make sculptures and figurative paintings that drew directly on real or imaginary childhood memories. Beninati first started studying law and then switched to film courses in the early 1990s while working as an assistant director in the Italian film industry. 

In 1994 he moved to London where he started working as a visual artist. In 2005 he was selected as one of four artists to represent his country at the 51 Venice Biennale where he received the audience award for the Italian pavilion. In 2006 he was given a fellowship at the American Academy in Rome as part of the Rome Prize. He currently lives and works in Palermo, Rome and Los Angeles where, together with his wife Milena Muzquiz (of Los Super Elegantes) he has founded an experimental theatre group. He is represented by James Cohan Gallery in New York, Tomio Koyama in Tokyo and Galleria Lorcan O'Neill in Rome.

In 2014 Beninati  had a solo show titled Nature is a Theatre at Inside-Out Art Museum in Beijing and in 2016 the Museo Civico in Castelbuono (Italy) has dedicated an anthological retrospective exhibition covering the first fifteen years of Beninati's work.

Beninati is also a patron of Italian cultural heritage, organizing exhibitions, workshops, seminars and producing publications on Italian talents, through a foundation he and his mother set up in the memory of his younger brother Flavio. Recent projects he has curated include a series of talks on Italian design and a workshop on architecture icon Aldo Rossi held by American architect Thomas Tsang in Hong Kong and Palermo.

Trivia
He has collaborated with Turkish fashion designer Rifat Ozbek on a dress commission by fashion bi-annual Another Magazine in 2007.
His work has appeared in a number of feature films such as, recently, Melissa P. and Flashbacks of a Fool.
The 2009 album Maboroshi (E. Ishibashi, G. Gebbia and D. Camarda) features two of Beninati's paintings on the front and back covers.

Solo shows
2016 "Manfredi Beninati", Museo Civico di Castelbuono, Italy 
2014 "Manfredi Beninati. Nature is a theater", Inside-Out Miniature Museum, Beijing, China
2013 "Manfredi Beninati. Il sei novembre del duemilatrentanove", Galleria Lorcan O'Neill, Rome, Italy
2011 "Manfredi Beninati", Cura Project Space, Rome, Italy
2011 "Manfredi Beninati. Le voci di dentro" FPAC, Palermo, Italy
2010 "Manfredi Beninati. Dicembre 2039", Max Wigram Gallery, London, UK
2009 "Manfredi Beninati. Rearranging the Landscapes around", Tomio Koyama Gallery, Tokyo, Japan
2008 "Manfredi Beninati. La natura morta", Max Wigram Gallery, London, U.K.
2007 "Manfredi Beninati. La lettera "f"", American Academy in Rome, Rome, Italy
2007 "Manfredi Beninati. Flavio and Palermo (in the summer) ", James Cohan Gallery, New York, USA
2007 "Manfredi Beninati. A Flavio", Museo Laboratorio, Città Sant'Angelo (PE), Italy
2006 "Manfredi Beninati",  Galeria Braga Menendez, Buenos Aires, Argentina
2005 "Manfredi Beninati. Rescued works",  Galleria Lorcan O’Neill,  Rome, Italy
2005 "Manfredi Beninati. Drawing cabinet",  FPAC,  Palermo, Italy
2005 "Manfredi Beninati. New Paintings",  James Cohan Gallery,  New York, USA
2003 "Manfredi Beninati", Galleria Lorcan O’Neill, Rome, Italy

Group shows
2017 "Fragments from nowherland", Kunsthochschule, Kassel, Germany
2016 "Anni Zero. 2016", Gallery of Art - Temple University, Rome, Italy
2016 "La torre di Babele", Pecci Museum, Prato, Italy
2016 "Contemporary Curated - The Erdem Moralioglu's choise", Sotheby's, London, UK 
2016 "Dall'oggi al domani. 24 ore nell'arte contemporanea", MACRO, Rome, Italy  
2015 "LOGO: Manfredi Beninati, Enzo Cucchi, Laboratorio Saccardi", Galleria Poggiali e Forconi, Florence, Italy
2013 "Outrageous Fortune", Touring Exhibition, Focal Point Gallery, Southend on Sea/ Hayward Gallery, London, UK
2013 "Artisti nello spazio - Da Lucio Fontana a oggi: gli ambienti nell'arte italiana", Fondazione Rocco Guglielmo, Catanzaro, Italy 
2012 "Reactivation", 9th Shanghai Biennale, Shanghai, China
2012 "Double Take", 2nd Mardin Bienali, Mardin, Turkey 
2011 "A rock and a hard place", 3rd Thessaloniki Biennale, Thessaloniki, Greece 
2011 "When in Rome", IIC Los Angeles and Hammer Museum, Los Angeles, U.S.A.
2011 "Outrageous Fortune", Touring Exhibition, Focal Point Gallery/ Hayward Gallery, U.K.
2011 "Vanitas!", UCLA, Los Angeles, U.S.A.
2011 "Archive Fever", Open Care, Milano, Italy
2011 "Premio Maretti", Museo Pecci, Prato, Italy
2011 "Accademia. Stanze. Persone.", American Academy in Rome, Italy
2010 "PPS", Riso - Museo Arte Contemporanea di Sicilia, Palermo, Italy
2010 "Argianas, Beninati, Bradley, Buchler, Hugonnier, Hulusi, White", Max Wigram Gallery, London, U.K.
2010 "Memento", La Giarina Arte Contemporanea, Verona, Italy
2010 "I can't feel my face", Royal T art space, Los Angeles, U.S.A.
2009 "Heaven", 2nd Athens Biennale 2009, Athens, Greece 
2009 "Collaudi", Italian Pavilion, 53 Venice Biennale, Venice, Italy
2009 "The Tree", James Cohan Gallery, Shanghai, China
2009 "No more than a point of view", Prague Biennale, Prague, Czech Republic
2009 "Escaping the dead ends", Istanbul Biennale, Istanbul, Turkey
2009 "Obsession: Contemporary art from the Lodeveans collection", University of Leeds, Leeds, U.K.
2009 "Collections, December; Atsushi Fukui, Gert&Uwe Tobias, Manfredi Beninati, Masaya Yoshimura", TKG Editions Kyoto, Kyoto, Japan
2008 "Made Up", Liverpool Biennial, Liverpool, U.K.
2008 "Sand: Memory, Meaning and Metaphor", Parrish Museum, Southampton (NY), U.S.A.
2008 "15th Rome Quadriennale", Palazzo delle Esposizioni, Rome, Italy
2008 "Imaginary Realities ...", Max Wigram Gallery, London,U.K.
2008 "Dream Therapy", Kathleen Cullen Fine Arts, New York, U.S.A.
2008 "Passed as present", York Art Gallery, York, U.K.
2007 "Summer Show", James Cohan Gallery, New York, USA
2007 "Arte italiana 1968-2007. Pittura", Palazzo Reale, Milano, Italy
2007 "The end begins", The Hospital, London, UK
2007 "Detour", The Art Directors Club,  New York, USA
2007 "Open Studios",  American Academy in Rome, Rome, Italy
2006 "Negotiating reality",  Victoria H. Myhren Gallery,  University of Denver, Denver, USA
2006 "C’era una volta un re...",  Arcos Museo,  Benevento, Italy
2006 "Figuring the landscape",  Contemporary Art Galleries, Storrs (Ct),  USA
2005 "Altmejd, Beninati, Everberg et Margolis", Galerie Ghislaine Hussenot, Paris, France
2005 "12 painters",  Galleria In Arco, AB+, Turin, Italy
2005 Padiglione Venezia at Giardini, 51 Venice Biennale, Venice, Italy
2004 "Between the lines",  James Cohan Gallery,  New York,  USA
2004 "Expander", Royal Academy of Arts,  London,  UK
2004 "Summer show",  Galleria Lorcan O’Neill,  Rome, Italy
2004 "Wall Paper",  GAMeC,  Bergamo, Italy
2003 "Dirty pictures",  The Approach Gallery,  London,  UK
2003 "Quadriennale di Roma-Anteprima", Palazzo Reale,  Naples, Italy
2003 "Roma 2003",  Galleria Pack,  Milan,  Italy
2003 "Le collezioni – Recenti acquisizioni", MAXXI – Museo Nazionale delle Arti del XXI Secolo, Rome, Italy
2002 "Www.plot@rt",  Rome, Italy

Collections
Zabludowicz Collection, Sarvisalo, London, New York
Logan Collection, Denver
Lodeveans Collection, London
MAXXI - Museo nazionale delle arti del XXI secolo, Rome
UBS Art Collection

Awards and residencies
IOAM - Inside-Out Art Museum, Beijing, 2013
Civitella Ranieri Foundation Fellowship, 2010 
Rome Prize, American Academy in Rome, 2006
Audience award – Italian pavilion, 51 Venice biennale, 2005
Darc Prize for young Italian art, 2004

Writings
 "Transhumanism according to Mr Campa", I quaderni di Eccegrammi, 2015
 Manfredi Beninati, "In an empty glass", Liverpool biennial catalog, 2008 
 Manfredi Beninati, "Une image fixe vous tient en dehors d'elle-meme", Ligeia, 2006 (PDF in French)

References

External links

 FLICKR IMAGES
Manfredi Beninati on JAMES COHAN GALLERY website
Manfredi Beninati on GALLERIA LORCAN O'NEILL website
Beninati on MAX WIGRAM GALLERY website
TOMIO KOYAMA website
From Chinese Wedding Cakes to Manfredi Beninati
Manfredi Beninati on RE-TITLE.com

Artists from Palermo
1970 births
Living people
Contemporary painters
Italian contemporary artists
21st-century Italian male artists
Postmodern artists